Agama turuensis is a species of lizard in the family Agamidae. It is a small lizard found in Tanzania.

References

Agama (genus)
Reptiles described in 1932
Taxa named by Arthur Loveridge